Rajiv Gandhi Degree College is a college in Rajahmundry, East Godavari DT., Andhra Pradesh, India. Courses offered include the BSc (Bachelor of Science), MSc (Master of Science), B.Com and B.A.

References

External links
 

Colleges affiliated to Andhra University
Education in Rajahmundry
Educational institutions established in 1991
1991 establishments in Andhra Pradesh